is a Japanese football player who plays for Tokyo Musashino City FC.

Career
Yuto Sashinami joined J1 League club Vegalta Sendai in 2016. March 23, he debuted in J.League Cup (v Albirex Niigata).

In March 2019, Sashinami signed with Croatian club NK BSK Belica. On 31 January 2020, Tokyo Musashino City FC announced the signing of Sashinami.

Club statistics
Updated to 22 February 2018.

References

External links
Profile at Kataller Toyama

1993 births
Living people
Meiji University alumni
Association football people from Aomori Prefecture
Japanese footballers
Japanese expatriate footballers
J1 League players
J3 League players
Vegalta Sendai players
Iwate Grulla Morioka players
Kataller Toyama players
Vanraure Hachinohe players
Tokyo Musashino United FC players
Japanese expatriate sportspeople in Croatia
Expatriate footballers in Croatia
Association football midfielders